This article contains information about all releases by Turkish pop artist Ajda Pekkan.

Albums

Studio albums

 Ajda Pekkan (1968)
 Fecri Ebcioğlu Sunar: Ajda Pekkan (1969)
 Ajda Pekkan Vol. 3 (1972)
 Süperstar (1977) 
 Pour Lui (1978)
 Süperstar 2 (1979)
 Sen Mutlu Ol (1981)
 Sevdim Seni (1982)
 Süperstar '83 (1983)
 Ajda Pekkan ve Beş Yıl Önce On Yıl Sonra (1985)
 Süperstar 4 (1987)
 Ajda 1990 (1990)
 Seni Seçtim (1991)
 Ajda '93 (1993)
 Ajda Pekkan (1996)
 Cool Kadın (2006)
 Aynen Öyle (2008)
 Farkın Bu (2011)
 Ajda Pekkan & Muazzez Abacı (2014)
 Ajda (2021)

Compilation albums
 Ajda (1975)
 Unutulmayanlar (1990)
 Hoşgör Sen (1992)
 The Best of Ajda (1998)
 Diva (2000)

Live albums
 La Fete A L’Olympia (1976)

Singles

Charts

References

Discographies of Turkish artists
Pop music discographies